Edmond Jacobs (14 October 1928 – 26 March 2012) was a Luxembourgian professional racing cyclist. He rode in the 1956 Tour de France.

References

External links
 

1928 births
2012 deaths
Luxembourgian male cyclists
People from Capellen (canton)